World Archaeology is a peer-reviewed academic journal covering all aspects of archaeology. It was established in 1969 and originally published triannually by Routledge & Kegan Paul. In 2004 it changed to a quarterly publication schedule while remaining under the Routledge imprint.

Each of the year's first three issues within a volume are dedicated to specific individual themes and topics within archaeology, and contributions address the topic from a variety of perspectives. The fourth and last issue of the year has been given over to coverage of current debates within archaeology, in which papers discuss significant issues and global concerns in the field.

Abstracting and indexing 
The journal is abstracted and indexed in:

External links 

 

Archaeology journals
Publications established in 1969
English-language journals
Taylor & Francis academic journals
Quarterly journals